Pierson (also known as Pierson Station) is an unincorporated community in Unity Township, Piatt County, Illinois, United States.

Geography

References 

Unincorporated communities in Piatt County, Illinois
Unincorporated communities in Illinois